Labarthe-sur-Lèze (literally Labarthe on Lèze) is a commune in the Haute-Garonne department in southwestern France.

Geography
The Lèze forms part of the commune's southern border, flows northward through the eastern part of the commune, then flows into the Ariège, which forms the commune's northeastern border.

Population

Twin towns
Labarthe-sur-Lèze is twinned with:
 Breda di Piave, Italy

See also
Communes of the Haute-Garonne department

References

Communes of Haute-Garonne